This is an index of Microsoft Windows games.

This list has been split into multiple pages. Please use the Table of Contents to browse it.

This list contains  game titles across all lists.

Notes

See also
 Lists of video games
 Index of DOS games
 List of Windows 3.x games

Windows
 
Windows